This is a demography of the population of Namibia including population density, ethnicity, education level, health of the populace, economic status, religious affiliations and other aspects of the population.

Population

Census results

As required by the Namibian Statistics Act #66 of 1976, and in accordance with United Nations recommendations, a census is conducted every ten years. After Namibian independence the first Population and Housing Census was carried out in 1991, further rounds followed in 2001 and 2011. The data collection method is to count every person resident in Namibia  wherever they happen to be. This is called the de facto method. For enumeration purposes the country is demarcated into 4,042 enumeration areas. These areas overlap with constituency boundaries in order to get reliable data for election purposes as well.

The 2011 Population and Housing Census counted 2,113,077 inhabitants of Namibia. Between 2001 and 2011 the annual population growth was 1.4%, down from 2.6% in the previous ten–year period.

In 2011 the total fertility rate was 3.6 children per woman, down from 4.1 in 2001.

UN estimates
The proportion of children below the age of 15 in 2010 was 36.4%, 59.9% was between 15 and 65 years of age, while 3.7% was 65 years or older
.

Population Estimates by Sex and Age Group (01.VII.2020):

Vital statistics
Registration of vital events in Namibia is not complete. The website Our World in Data prepared the following estimates based on statistics from the Population Department of the United Nations.

Fertility and births
Total Fertility Rate (TFR) (followed by wanted fertility rate in brackets) and Crude Birth Rate (CBR):

Fertility data as of 2013 (DHS Program):

Life expectancy at birth
Life expectancy from 1950 to 2015 (UN World Population Prospects):

Ethnic groups
Namibia has many ethnic groups. The 9 main ethnic groups are:

Coloured / Baster
Herero
Kavango people
Khoisan
Nama / Damara
Ovambo people
Tswana people
White Namibians
Zambezi people

The majority of the Namibian population is of Bantu-speaking origin—mostly of the Ovambo ethnicity, which forms about half of the population—residing mainly in the north of the country, although many are now resident in towns throughout Namibia. They also include the Zambezi people and Kavango people. Other ethnic groups are the Herero and Himba people, who speak a similar language, and the Damara, who speak the same "click" language as the Nama.  Herero and Nama peoples make up less than 10% of the population, but at the beginning of the 20th century and before the Herero and Namaqua Genocide, they made up a majority.

In addition to the Bantu majority, there are large groups of Khoisan (such as Nama and San), who are descendants of the original inhabitants of Southern Africa. The country also contains some descendants of refugees from Angola. There are also two smaller groups of people with mixed racial origins, called "Coloureds" and "Basters", who together make up 8.0% (with the Coloureds outnumbering the Basters two to one). There is a substantial Chinese minority in Namibia; it stood at 40,000 in 2006.

Whites (mainly of Afrikaner, German, British and Portuguese origin) make up between 4.0 and 7.0% of the population. Although their proportion of the population decreased after independence due to emigration and lower birth rates, they still form the second-largest population of European ancestry, both in terms of percentage and actual numbers, in Sub-Saharan Africa (after South Africa). The majority of Namibian whites and nearly all those who are of mixed race, speak Afrikaans and share similar origins, culture, and religion as the white and coloured populations of South Africa. A large minority of whites (around 30,000) trace their family origins back to the German settlers who colonised Namibia prior to the British confiscation of German lands after World War I, and they maintain German cultural and educational institutions. Nearly all Portuguese settlers came to the country from the former Portuguese colony of Angola. The 1960 census reported 526,004 persons in what was then South West Africa, including 73,464 whites (14%). Due to colonialism, whites hold a substantial amount of Namibian land, with about 4,500 settlers owning almost half of the country.

Languages
 Oshiwambo – 48.9%
 Khoekhoegowab – 11.3%
 Afrikaans – 10.4%
 Otjiherero – 8.6%
 RuKwangali – 8.5%
 Silozi – 4.8%
 English (official language) – 3.4%
 Setswana – 0.3%
 Other African languages – 2.3%
 Other – 1.7%

Religion
Missionary work during the 19th century drew many Namibians to Christianity, especially Lutheranism. While most Namibian Christians are Lutheran, there also are Roman Catholic, Methodist, Anglican, African Methodist Episcopal, and Dutch Reformed Christians represented.

Christian 80% to 90% (at least 50% Lutheran)
Indigenous beliefs 10% to 20%

Other demographic statistics 
Modern education and medical care have been extended in varying degrees to most rural areas in recent years. The literacy rate of Africans is generally low except in sections where missionary and government education efforts have been concentrated, such as Ovamboland. The Africans speak various indigenous languages.

Demographic statistics according to the World Population Review in 2022.

One birth every 8 minutes	
One death every 27 minutes	
One net migrant every 131 minutes	
Net gain of one person every 11 minutes

The following demographic are from the CIA World Factbook unless otherwise indicated.

Population
2,727,409 (2022 est.)
2,533,224 (July 2018 est.)

Religions
Christian 97.5%, other 0.6% (includes Muslim, Baha'i, Jewish, Buddhist), unaffiliated 1.9% (2020 est.)

Age structure
0–14 years: 35.68% (male 473,937/female 464,453)
15–24 years: 20.27% (male 267,106/female 265,882)
25–54 years: 35.47% (male 449,132/female 483,811)
55–64 years: 4.68% (male 54,589/female 68,619)
65 years and over: 3.9% (2020 est.) (male 43,596/female 58,948)

0–14 years: 36.54% (male 467,392 /female 458,190)
15–24 years: 20.34% (male 257,190 /female 257,984)
25–54 years: 34.74% (male 421,849 /female 458,118)
55–64 years: 4.46% (male 50,459 /female 62,478)
65 years and over: 3.93% (male 42,381 /female 57,183) (2018 est.)

Birth rate
25.01 births/1,000 population (2022 est.) Country comparison to the world: 45th
25.33 births/1,000 population (2021 est.) Country comparison to the world: 45th

Death rate
6.85 deaths/1,000 population (2022 est.) Country comparison to the world: 124th
7.07 deaths/1,000 population (2021 est.) Country comparison to the world: 117th

Total fertility rate
2.98 children born/woman (2022 est.) Country comparison to the world: 48th
3.03 children born/woman (2021 est.) Country comparison to the world: 48th

Median age
total: 21.8 years. Country comparison to the world: 183rd
male: 21.1 years
female: 22.6 years (2020 est.)

Population growth rate
1.82% (2022 est.) Country comparison to the world: 50th
1.83% (2020 est.) Country comparison to the world: 45th

Mother's mean age at first birth
21.5 years (2013 est.) 
note: median age at first birth among women 25–29

Contraceptive prevalence rate
56.1% (2013)

Net migration rate
0 migrant(s)/1,000 population (2022 est.) Country comparison to the world: 94th

Urbanization
urban population: 54% of total population (2022)
rate of urbanization: 3.64% annual rate of change (2020–25 est.)

urban population: 50% of total population (2018)
rate of urbanization: 4.2% annual rate of change (2015–20 est.)

Major infectious diseases
degree of risk: high (2020)
food or waterborne diseases: bacterial diarrhea, hepatitis A, and typhoid fever
vectorborne diseases: malaria
water contact diseases: schistosomiasis

Dependency ratios
total dependency ratio: 68.1 (2015 est.)
youth dependency ratio: 62.2 (2015 est.)
elderly dependency ratio: 5.8 (2015 est.)
potential support ratio: 17.1 (2015 est.)

Education expenditures
9.4% of GDP (2020) Country comparison to the world: 6th

Sex ratio
at birth:
1.03 male(s)/female (2017 est.)
under 15 years:
1.02 male(s)/female (2017 est.)
15–64 years:
0.99 male(s)/female (2017 est.)
65 years and over:
0.75 male(s)/female  (2017 est.)total population:
0.96 male(s)/female (2017 est.)

Life expectancy at birth
total population: 65.87 years (2021 est.)  Country comparison to the world: 197th
male: 63.9 years (2021 est.)
female: 67.9 years (2021 est.)

HIV/AIDS
adult prevalence rate: 12.7% (2019 est.) Country comparison to the world: 6th

people living with HIV/AIDS: 210,000 (2019 est.)

deaths: 3,000 (2019 est.)

Nationality
noun:
Namibian(s)
adjective:
Namibian

Literacy
definition: age 15 and over can read and write (2015 est.)
total population: 91.5% (2018 est.)
male: 91.6% (2018 est.)
female: 91.4% (2018 est.)

Unemployment, youth ages 15–24
total: 38%
male: 37.5%
female: 38.5% (2018 est.)

References

External links

 Namibian People